Bidirectional hydrogenase may refer to:
 Ferredoxin hydrogenase, an enzyme
 Hydrogen dehydrogenase, an enzyme